Duleh Sib (also Romanized as Dūleh Sīb; also known as Dūleh Sīb-e Rīg) is a village in Rig Rural District, in the Central District of Lordegan County, Chaharmahal and Bakhtiari Province, Iran. At the 2006 census, its population was 776, in 142 families.

References 

Populated places in Lordegan County